Carlos Moguel Jr. (born June 21, 2003) is an American professional soccer player who plays as a midfielder for USL Championship side Louisville City.

Career

Youth
Moguel attended Martha Layne Collins High School in Shelbyville, Kentucky, where he was a Louisville Courier-Journal All-Area nominee and honorable mention to the All-State list. He played as part of the Louisville City academy and went on to sign a USL Academy contract with the club on February 22, 2021, allowing him to retain his NCAA eligibility, but also to play with the club's senior team.

Professional
On September 27, 2021, Moguel Jr. signed a full professional contract with Louisville City to compete in the USL Championship. He made his debut for Louisville on October 23, 2021, appearing as a 79th–minute substitute during a 3–1 win over Memphis 901.

References

External links
Profile at the Louisville City website

2003 births
Living people
American soccer players
Association football midfielders
Louisville City FC players
People from Shelby County, Kentucky
Soccer players from Kentucky
USL Championship players